The Gujarati  Shaikh are a Muslim community found in the state of Gujarat in India. The Shaikhs of Gujarat have no single definite origin, as anyone could take up the title "shaikh" and thus different groups could be called Shaikhs, regardless of common origin. Socioeconomically, they range from poor labourers to the urban lower class.

While most Gujarati Muslims have Gujarati as their mother tongue, but they, along with the Momin Ansari, Memons have Urdu as their mother tongue

The Sodagar

The Sodagar or "Arab Shaikh" are a small sub-group within the larger Shaikh community. They originate from the Hadhramaut region of Yemen, and settled in the city of Patan, during the period of Mughal rule, and intermarried with the Sunni Bohra community. The community were involved the buying and selling of silk, and exporting it to the Middle East. They still maintain links with the Middle East, being fluent in Arabic. But the Sodagar mohalla in Patan has declined, with many of their houses becoming crumbling ruins. They have their own caste association, the Jamat Shams Sodagaran, which is involved in the up keep of their jamat khana, in the town of Patan. They are strictly endogamous, and do not marry with other Shaikh groups. There are still cases of intermarriage with Arab communities in the Middle East.

See also

 Shaikhs in South Asia
 Sindhi Shaikhs

References

Social groups of Gujarat
Muslim communities of India
Muslim communities of Gujarat
Shaikh clans